Woodland Cemetery is the oldest cemetery in Des Moines, Iowa, having been established in 1848, before Des Moines was the state capital. It is a municipal cemetery owned and operated by the Des Moines Parks and Recreation Department.

History
The cemetery was created in 1848 when five local farmers donated  of land to create it. It was originally called Fort Des Moines Cemetery. The first burial took place in 1850, the burial of Thomas Casady, the infant son of Iowa state senator Phineas M. Casady. The city took ownership of the cemetery in 1857, and purchased an additional 36.5 acres in 1864. The City Receiving Vault, which was used to store bodies when the ground was too frozen for graves to be dug, was built in the 1880s.

Within the grounds are subsections. These include St. Ambrose Cemetery (relocated from elsewhere in Des Moines in 1866), the Emmanuel Jewish Cemetery founded in 1871, and an Independent Order of Odd Fellows Cemetery.

In 1986, the city council of Des Moines designated the cemetery a local historic landmark. Various restoration projects have been undertaken in recent years. A new arch over the entrance was constructed in 2012. An effort to restore the mausoleum of Samuel Merrill, the seventh governor of Iowa was started. A project to add markers to hundreds of previously unmarked children's graves on "Baby Hill" from the earliest days of the cemetery concluded successfully in April 2017.

A number of historic neighborhoods are near the cemetery, including Sherman Hill to the east, Woodland Place to the west, Ingersoll Place to the southwest.

Notable interments

 Rollin V. Ankeny (1830 – 1901), soldier
 Nathaniel B. Baker (1818 – 1876), politician
 Martha Callanan, (1826 – 1901), woman's suffrage advocate, newspaper publisher
 Chester C. Cole, Chief Justice of the Iowa Supreme Court
 Rose Connor (1892 – 1970), architect
 Ira Cook (1821 – 1902), land surveyor, businessman, politician
 Marcellus M. Crocker (1830 – 1865), American Civil War general
 Albert B. Cummins (1850 – 1926), 18th governor of Iowa
 Ida L. Cummins (1853 – 1918) Women's and children's rights activist
 Alvah Frisbie (1830 – 1917), Pioneer minister
 Josiah Given (1828 – 1908) attorney, soldier and Iowa Supreme Court justice
 Cora Bussey Hillis (1858 – 1924) child welfare advocate
 Frederick Marion Hubbell (1839 – 1930), prominent Des Moines businessman
 John A. Kasson (1822 – 1910), politician
 John MacVicar (1859 – 1928), progressive mayor of Des Moines (elected 1896, 1898, 1900 and 1928)
 Samuel Merrill (1822 – 1899), 7th governor of Iowa
 Calista Halsey Patchin (1845 – 1920), first woman reporter for the Washington Post
 Emory Jenison Pike (1876 – 1918), a World War I recipient of the Medal of Honor 
 Charles A. Rawson (1867 – 1936), unelected Senator for Iowa in 1922
 Annie Nowlin Savery (1831 – 1891), women's suffrage activist and philanthropist
 James C. Savery (1826 – 1905) businessman who built the Savery Hotel
 Hoyt Sherman (1827 – 1904), banker, namesake of Hoyt Sherman Place
 Hiram Y. Smith (1843 – 1894), politician
 Seward Smith (1830 – 1887), lawyer, politician
 Sumner F. Spofford, one of the first mayors of Des Moines
 S. S. Still (1851 – 1931), osteopath
 James M. Tuttle (1823 – 1892), soldier
 Henry Cantwell Wallace (1866 – 1924), politician
 James B. Weaver (1833 – 1912), politician
 George G. Wright (1820 – 1896), politician
 Lafayette Young (1848 – 1926), journalist
 Sarah Palmer Young (1830 – 1908), nurse and writer

References

External links

 Des Moines Municipal Cemeteries
 

Cemeteries_in_Iowa
Geography of Des Moines, Iowa